MML can stand for:

Academia
Master of Modern Languages, an undergraduate degree offered by the University of Manchester, which includes the study of two modern languages to Master's level
Medieval and Modern Languages, an undergraduate degree offered by the Faculty of Medieval and Modern Languages, University of Oxford (FMML)
Modern and Medieval Languages, an undergraduate degree offered by (and the corresponding faculty at) the  University of Cambridge

Computer programming
Medical Markup Language, an application of Extensible Markup Language (XML).
MML (language), man-machine language, a computer language.
Modeling Maturity Level, a scale to indicate to which degree an architecture uses models (used in software development).
Music Macro Language, a music notation format used in producing music for personal computers and video game systems.
Music Markup Language, an application of Extensible Markup Language (XML).
An abbreviation for the voice over IP application Mumble, primarily designed for use by Scottermac (mml).

Events
Middlesbrough Music Live

Forums, organizations, or companies
Maskew Miller Longman, a South African publishing company part-owned by the UK's Pearson Plc
Michigan Municipal League, a non-profit organization representing Michigan cities, villages and urban townships
MML Capital Partners an international investment company
 Material Measurement Laboratory, a NIST laboratory since 2010

Gaming
"MML", level from a game that is exclusive to PlayStation 3 called "HAZE"

Mathematics
2050 in Roman numerals
Minimum Message Length, a form of unbiased statistical modeling based on information theory
MyMathLab, an online education platform, developed by Pearson Education, for teaching and learning mathematics

Transportation
The IATA airport code for Southwest Minnesota Regional Airport
The Midland Main Line, a main line railway in the United Kingdom
Midland Mainline, a former railway company that operated the Midland Main Line.

Others
 Myeloid/lymphoid or mixed-lineage leukemia
 Multi-Mission Launcher, an American missile launcher